Established in 2001, Sovereign Capital Partners LLP is a UK-based private equity specialist renowned for 'Buy & Build'.  It invests in companies in business and technology services, healthcare and pharmaceutical services and education & training sectors, and has close to £1,000m of funds under management.

The firm invests up to £50m of capital in each business, partnering management teams to help them achieve significant growth through both organic roll-out and acquisition. Alongside this, Sovereign's in-house research team helps portfolio companies to source strategic acquisitions that will extend the company's service offering and geographic coverage.

The business has supported the growth strategies of some of the fastest growing companies in the UK as recognised in the Sunday Times Buyout Track 100 and the Sunday Times Buyout Fast Track 100. Companies include City & County Healthcare Group, National Fostering Agency and Lifetime.

Investments include 
City & County Healthcare Group, a UK domiciliary care businesses. The Group provides 140,000 hours of personal support per week to people in their own homes.
Cordium (previously IMS Group), a provider of consulting and integrated business support to the wholesale asset management and securities industry. The Group's core service offering is regulatory compliance consulting to UK and international regulated financial services firms.  
Lifetime, a vocational training provider, offering pre-employment training, apprenticeship programmes and training courses to people in the fitness, retail, care and hospitality industries.
Creare Group, web development/SEO company.
The Eaton House Group of Schools, a group of private schools in London.

References

External links

Private equity firms of the United Kingdom
Financial services companies established in 2001